Tarık Akan (born Tarık Tahsin Üregül, 13 December 1949 – 16 September 2016) was a Turkish film actor and producer, who started his activity in the 1970s.

Early life
Akan was born as Tarık Tahsin Üregül in Istanbul on 13 December 1949. He was the third child of the family after a daughter and a son. His family was constantly moving around Turkey due to his father's occupation in the military. Schooled in Erzurum, he completed the elementary education in Kayseri. Following his father's retirement, the family moved to Istanbul and settled in Bakırköy. Akan attended Yıldız Technical University to study mechanical engineering, graduated later from the College of Journalist.

Before he started his acting career, he worked as a lifeguard at beaches and at a boat renting place in Bakırköy.

He completed his military service in Denizli in 1979.

He was jailed for two-and-half months with cell confinement following the 1980 Turkish coup d'état. A right-wing politics daily defamed him with a false news in the headline for a speech he allegedly addressed in Germany in early 1981, leading to a long court case demanding for 12 years imprisonment.

In 1986, he married Yasemin Erkut. He became father of a son, Barış Zeki Üregül, the same year. Two years later, twins, Yaşar Özgür, a son, and Özlem, a daughter, were born. The couple divorced in 1989.

His son Barış Zeki began an acting career in 2009 with the film Deli Deli Olma, in which he played with his father and portrayed the young actor Tarık Akan.

Acting career
He entered a movie actor contest of the magazine Ses ("Voice"), and ended up runner up. He studied acting under the eye of famous Turkish film director Ertem Eğilmez (1929–1989).

He made his film debut in 1970 at the age of 21 in Vefasız, and adopted the stage name "Tarık Akan". Between 1970 and 1975, in the heyday of Yeşilçam,  he acted in 12 films a year in average. He appeared with Emel Sayın in Mavi Boncuk, Hülya Koçyiğit in Sev Kardeşim, Hale Soygazi in Gece Kuşu Zehra, and entered into the "list of unforgettables" with Hababam Sınıfı.

At first, most of his roles were in romantic comedies. Later in his career, he has taken on more political and dramatic roles. The first film of this genre was Nehir, in which he shared the role with Cüneyt Arkın. Political films like Maden, Sürü, Yol and Kanal followed.

He acted in a total of 110 films, and won numerous awards from various festivals including Cannes and Berlin. He won an Honourable Mention at the 35th Berlin International Film Festival for his role in Pehlivan.

Later years
He also directed several productions such as documentaries and serials for television. In 2002, he published his first book Anne Kafamda Bit Var, a biography of his life and his time in prison.

In 1991, he took over the elementary school in Bakırköy, in which he was educated, and transferred it to his own Özel Taş İlköğretim Okulu.

In 2005, he became the chairman of the education-aimed "Nesin Foundation", succeeding Ali Nesin, the son of the founder Aziz Nesin. In his later years, he was served as chairman of the "Nazım Hikmet Cultural and Arts Foundation".

Illness and death
Akan contracted lung cancer, and was in treatment for over one year. In the early hours of 16 September 2016, he died at the age of 66 in the intensive care station of a private hospital in Istanbul.

On 18 September, he was interred at Zuhuratbaba Cemetery in Bakırköy following a memorial service held in Harbiye Muhsin Ertuğrul Stage and the religious funeral service at Teşvikiye Mosque. The funeral was attended by thousands of people, his castmates, former President of Turkey Ahmet Necdet Sezer and the leader of the main opposition party Kemal Kılıçdaroğlu.

Filmography

1970s

1980s

1990s-2000s

References

External links
 

1949 births
Yıldız Technical University alumni
Male actors from Istanbul
Turkish male film actors
Best Actor Golden Orange Award winners
Best Actor Golden Boll Award winners
Golden Orange Life Achievement Award winners
Golden Butterfly Award winners
Deaths from lung cancer in Turkey
2016 deaths
Burials at Zuhuratbaba Cemetery